Eirik Sivertsen (born 17 March 1971) is a Norwegian politician who represents Arbeiderpartiet. He has been the leader of Bodø Arbeiderparti since August 2006. At the  2009 Norwegian parliamentary election, Sivertsen was the party's third candidate in Nordland.

Since the municipal elections in 2007, he has been a full-time politician, as leader of the Planning, Business and Environment committee in Bodø municipality. 
Sivertsen previously worked at the quality coordinator at Bodø University College.

External links
 TV2 - Presentation by the candidate.

Politicians from Bodø
1971 births
Living people
Members of the Storting
21st-century Norwegian politicians